Triquet Island is an island off the west coast of British Columbia, Canada. It is south of Hunter and Campbell Islands facing the open Queen Charlotte Sound to the west. The island is administered as part of the Central Coast Regional District. The climate of the area is temperate.

A village discovered in 2017 on Triquet Island by an archaeological team from the University of Victoria appears to verify local First Nation oral history that humans took refuge on Pacific Coast islands during the ice age. A hearth excavated at the site was determined by radiocarbon dating to be between 13,613 and 14,086 years old, making it one of the oldest settlements in North America.

See also
 Heiltsuk
 On Your Knees Cave
 Settlement of the Americas

References

Islands of British Columbia
Archaeological sites in British Columbia
Pre-Clovis archaeological sites in the Americas